Avun Cyd Jephcott (born 16 October 1983 in Coventry, England) is a footballer and plays as a midfielder.

Career
While a young prodigy at Coventry City, Jephcott was pursued by fellow Premier League clubs Aston Villa, Everton and Leeds United. However, a cruciate ligament injury that Jephcott sustained in a reserve game against Leigh RMI, scared off potential buyers and the player moved to non-league football, having appeared a handful of times from the bench for Coventry City in the Premier League and League Cup, and having spent loan spells with Tamworth and Notts County. Jephcott had spells in the Irish League at Ards and Linfield before joining Larne in January 2008.
Jephcott returned to the English non league scene, and became a much travelled player, taking in spells at Nuneaton Borough, Leamington, Corby Town, Worcester City, Chasetown and Halesowen Town amongst others.

Following a spell at Wolverhampton Casuals in 2014, Jephcott followed manager Carl Abbott and fellow players John Melligan and Matt Bailey in signing for Hinckley AFC in May 2014.

Education
He is currently studying for a BA in Spanish Literature at Oxford.

References

External links

1983 births
Living people
English footballers
Coventry City F.C. players
Tamworth F.C. players
Notts County F.C. players
Nuneaton Borough F.C. players
Rugby Town F.C. players
Ards F.C. players
Linfield F.C. players
Stratford Town F.C. players
Leamington F.C. players
Woodford United F.C. players
Worcester City F.C. players
Coventry Alvis F.C. players
Tividale F.C. players
Hinckley A.F.C. players
Coventry United F.C. players
Association football forwards
Footballers from Coventry
English Football League players